Chang-rae Lee (born July 29, 1965) is a Korean-American novelist and a professor of creative writing at Stanford University. He was previously Professor of Creative Writing at Princeton and director of Princeton's Program in Creative Writing.

Early life
Lee was born in South Korea in 1965 to Young Yong and Inja Hong Lee. He immigrated to the United States with his family when he was 3 years old  to join his father, who was then a psychiatric resident and later established a successful practice in Westchester County, New York. In a 1999 interview with Ferdinand M. De Leon, Lee described his childhood as "a standard suburban American upbringing," in which he attended Phillips Exeter Academy in Exeter, New Hampshire, before earning a B.A. in English at Yale University in 1987. After working as an equities analyst on Wall Street for a year, he enrolled at the University of Oregon. With the manuscript for Native Speaker as his thesis, he received a master of fine arts degree in writing in 1993 and became an assistant professor of creative writing at the university. On 19 June 1993 Lee married architect Michelle Branca, with whom he has two daughters. The success of his debut novel, Native Speaker, led Lee to move to Hunter College of the City University of New York, where he was hired to direct and teach in the prestigious creative-writing program.

Career
Lee's first novel, Native Speaker (1995), won numerous awards including the Hemingway Foundation/PEN Award. Centered on a Korean-American industrial spy, the novel explores themes of alienation and betrayal as experienced by immigrants and first-generation citizens, in their struggle to assimilate in American life. In 1999, he published his second novel, A Gesture Life. This elaborated on his themes of identity and assimilation through the narrative of an elderly Japanese immigrant in the US who was born in Korea but later adopted to a Japanese family and remembers treating Korean comfort women during World War II. For this book, Lee received the Asian-American Literary Award. His 2004 novel Aloft received mixed notices from the critics and featured Lee's first protagonist who is not Asian American, but a disengaged and isolated Italian-American suburbanite forced to deal with his world. It received the 2006 Asian/Pacific American Award for Literature in the Adult Fiction category. His 2010 novel The Surrendered won the 2011 Dayton Literary Peace Prize and was a nominated finalist for the 2011 Pulitzer Prize for Fiction. Lee's next novel, On Such a Full Sea (2014) is set in a dystopian future version of the American city of Baltimore, Maryland called B-Mor where the main character, Fan, is a Chinese-American laborer working as a diver in a fish farm. It was a finalist for the 2014 National Book Critics Circle Award.

In 2016, Lee joined the faculty of Stanford University, where he is the Ward W. and Priscilla B. Woods Professor of English. He previously taught creative writing in the Lewis Center for the Arts at Princeton University. He was also a Shinhan Distinguished Visiting Professor at Yonsei University in South Korea.

Lee has compared his writing process to spelunking. "You kind of create the right path for yourself. But, boy, are there so many points at which you think, absolutely, I'm going down the wrong hole here. And I can't get back to the right hole."

Major themes
Lee explores issues central to the Asian-American experience: the legacy of the past; the encounter of diverse cultures; the challenges of racism and discrimination, and exclusion;  dreams achieved and dreams deferred. In the process of developing and defining itself, then, Asian-American literature speaks to the very heart of what it means to be American. The authors of this literature above all concern themselves with identity, with the question of becoming and being American, of being accepted, not "foreign."   Lee's writings have addressed these questions of identity, exile and diaspora, assimilation, and alienation.

Awards and honors 

 1995 Barnes & Noble Discover Great New Writers Award for Native Speaker
 1996 Pen/Hemingway Award for Native Speaker
 NAIBA Book of the Year Award for A Gesture Life
 2000 Anisfield-Wolf Book Award for A Gesture Life
 2011 Finalist for the Pulitzer Prize in Fiction for The Surrendered
 2011 Dayton Literary Peace Prize for The Surrendered
 2015 ALA Notable Book of the Year for On Such A Full Sea
 2017 John Dos Passos Prize for Literature

Bibliography

Books
 Native Speaker (Riverhead, 1994)
 A Gesture Life (Riverhead, 1999)
 Aloft (Riverhead, 2004)
 The Surrendered (Riverhead, 2010)
 On Such a Full Sea (Riverhead, 2014)
 My Year Abroad (2021)

Articles

Screenplays

 Coming Home Again (co-written and directed by Wayne Wang, 2019)

References

External links

 "Mute in an English-Only World", an essay by Lee in the anthology Dream Me Home Safely: Writers on Growing Up in America, at Google Books
Interview with Lee at Words on a Wire
 KGNU Claudia Cragg radio interview with Chang-Rae Lee, March 2011, on 'The Surrendered'.

1965 births
Living people
20th-century American novelists
21st-century American novelists
American male novelists
American writers of Korean descent
The New Yorker people
People from Princeton, New Jersey
People from Westchester County, New York
Phillips Exeter Academy alumni
Princeton University faculty
South Korean emigrants to the United States
University of Oregon alumni
Novelists from New Jersey
Novelists from Oregon
Yale University alumni
American novelists of Asian descent
Hemingway Foundation/PEN Award winners
American Book Award winners
20th-century American male writers
21st-century American male writers
Novelists from New York (state)